A.K.M. Shahjahan Kamal (born 10 February 1950) is a Bangladeshi politician. He is a parliament member of Jatiya Sangsad and the former Minister of Civil Aviation and Tourism. In the 2014 Bangladeshi general election he was elected from the Lakshmipur-3 seat. He was District Director of Lakshmipur district council. He is one of the directors of Janata Bank Limited.

References

Living people
1950 births
People from Lakshmipur District
Awami League politicians
Civil Aviation and Tourism ministers of Bangladesh
11th Jatiya Sangsad members
10th Jatiya Sangsad members